The Farakka Long March occurred in May 1976, and was led by Maulana Abdul Hamid Khan Bhashani, demanding demolition of the Farakka Barrage constructed by India to divert flow of Ganges waters inside its territory, triggering the drying up of river Padma and desertification of Bangladesh. It was the first popular movement against India demanding a rightful distribution of the Ganges's water. Since then Historic Farakka Long March Day is observed on 16 May every year in Bangladesh.

The-then government of Bangladesh unofficially supported Bhashani's Farakka Long March. Navy-chief Rear Admiral M. H. Khan in charge of providing logistics. Hundreds of thousands of people from all over the country gathered in Rajshahi town to participate in the Long March.

On the morning of 16 May 1976, he addressed a gathering of people at the Madrash Maidan, Rajshahi, from where the Long March commenced. Hundreds of thousands of people walked more than 100 kilometers on foot for days. The March continued up to Kansat, a place near the India-Bangladesh border, close to the Farakka barrage.

References

External links
  

Politics of Bangladesh
Bangladesh–India relations
1976 in Bangladesh
1976 in international relations